This page lists notable alumni of the University of California, Davis.

Academics

University presidents

Professors

Science

Astronauts
 Tracy Caldwell Dyson
 Stephen K. Robinson

Computer science

Engineering

Economics
 Ahmad Faruqui, defense analyst and economist
 Masami Imai, Japanese economist
 Timothy Francis McCarthy, financial services chief executive
 Mahmoud Solh, Lebanese agricultural economist and genetic scientist; Director General of the International Center for Agricultural Research in the Dry Areas

Biology

Geosciences
 Christopher G. Newhall, volcanologist
 Gabriel Filippelli, biogeochemist

Other

Arts, entertainment, and literature

Fine art

Music
{{columns-list|colwidth=20em|
 Yul Anderson, pianist, guitarist, singer
 Cam, country music artist known for the hit "Burning House"
 Luciano Chessa, Italian musicologist
 Gift of Gab, rapper
 Rita Hosking, award-winning songwriter, singer
 Ruby Ibarra, rapper
 Tom Jans, singer/songwriter
 The Jealous Sound, indie rock band
 Knapsack, indie rock band
 Lateef the Truthspeaker (real name Lateef Daumont), rapper
 Lyrics Born (real name Tom Shimura), rapper
 Steven Mackey, guitarist and composer
 Scott Miller, guitarist and singer/songwriter, founder of Game Theory and The Loud Family
 Mano Murthy, composer
 Dave Nachmanoff, award-winning American folk singer-songwriter 
 Paris, rapper
 Lindsey Pavao, contestant on the second season of The Voice
 DJ Shadow (real name Joshua Davis), music producer, DJ, and songwriter
 Sholi, indie rock band
 Kendra Smith, musician
 Cadence Spalding, educator, vocalist, instrumentalist and composer
 Donnette Thayer, musician
 Russ Tolman, guitarist for True West
 Stuart Michael Thomas, film composer
 Joyo Velarde, hip hop and pop singer
 Steve Wynn, musician

Literature

Film and television

Comedy
 Bruce Baum, comedian
 Tim Lee, comedian
 Hasan Minhaj, comedian

Other
 Jenny Cho, broadcaster
 Jenn Im, fashion and beauty vlogger
 Meghan Kalkstein, broadcast journalist
 Tiffany Lam, beauty queen, Miss Hong Kong 2002
 Mike Pondsmith, game designer
 Squeex, Twitch streamer who regularly speedruns Super Mario 64
 Henry Wofford, SportsNet Central anchor/reporter for Comcast SportsNet in San Francisco

Athletics

Olympians

Baseball

Basketball

 Chima Moneke, basketball player for Sacramento Kings of the NBA 2022

Football
{{columns-list|colwidth=20em|
 Nick Aliotti, defensive coordinator for University of Oregon
 Mike Bellotti, former head football coach for the University of Oregon
 Rolf Benirschke, placekicker for the San Diego Chargers of the NFL
 Bob Biggs, former head coach for UC Davis
 Chris Carter, former wide receiver for Seattle Seahawks
 Jonathan Compas, former NFL offensive lineman, Tampa Bay Buccaneers
 Kevin Daft, offensive coordinator for UC Davis
 Bo Eason, safety for the Houston Oilers of the NFL
 Daniel Fells, tight end for the Denver Broncos
 Bakari Grant, wide receiver for Calgary Stampeders
 Mark Grieb, quarterback for the San Jose Sabercats of the Arena Football League
 Daryl Gross, Athletic Director, Syracuse University
 Nathaniel Hackett, offensive coordinator for the Buffalo Bills
 Ejiro Evero defensive coordinator for the Denver Broncos
 Paul Hackett, former head coach for University of Pittsburgh and University of Southern California
 Dan Hawkins, former head coach for the University of Colorado and Boise State, current head coach of UC Davis Aggies football
 Khari Jones, Arena Football League and Canadian Football League quarterback and sports reporter
 Bryan Lee-Lauduski, former quarterback for Iowa Barnstormers 
 Brad Lekkerkerker, offensive lineman for the Oakland Raiders of the NFL
 Cory Lekkerkerker, offensive lineman for the Los Angeles Chargers of the NFL
 Chris Mandeville, defensive back
 Rich Martini, former wide receiver for Oakland Raiders
 Casey Merrill, NFL defensive end
 Mike Moroski, NFL quarterback for the Atlanta Falcons and San Francisco 49ers
 Ken O'Brien, 11-year quarterback for the New York Jets and Philadelphia Eagles, first round selection in 1983 NFL Draft
 J. T. O'Sullivan, former quarterback for the New Orleans Saints and Cincinnati Bengals
 Chris Petersen, former head coach for the University of Washington and Boise State
 Frank Scalercio, former head coach for Sonoma State Cossacks
 Colton Schmidt, punter for the Buffalo Bills
 Kermit Schmidt, NFL running back
 Elliot Vallejo, former player for Oakland Raiders
 Demario Warren, head coach for Southern Utah Thunderbirds
 Mike Wise, NFL defensive end
 Daryl Hill, former secondary/running backs coach UC Davis and New Mexico Highland University and Saint Mary College, Moraga

Golf
 Brad Bell, professional golfer from Sacramento, California
 Scott Gordon, professional golfer who plays on the PGA Tour
 Matt Marshall, professional golfer from Carlton, Oregon
 Demi Runas, professional golfer

Soccer

Wrestling
 Urijah Faber, wrestler; retired professional mixed martial artist, formerly WEC featherweight champion and UFC bantamweight contender
 John Hennigan, professional wrestler known for his time in WWE as Johnny Nitro and John Morrison
 Tim Lajcik, mixed martial artist, stuntman, and actor

Other
 Alycia Moulton, tennis player
 Dave Scott, 6-time champion at Ironman World Championship
 Shiva Vashishat, cricket player

Business

Government

Foreign officials

Federal government

Ambassadors
 Leslie A. Bassett, United States Ambassador to Paraguay
 Kathleen A. FitzGibbon, United States Ambassador to Niger
 Anthony Godfrey, United States Ambassador to Serbia
 Sheila Gwaltney, United States Ambassador to Kyrgyzstan
 Scot Marciel, United States Ambassador to Myanmar
 Erin Elizabeth McKee, United States Ambassador to the Solomon Islands
 Howard Van Vranken, United States Ambassador to Botswana

Members of the U.S. House of Representatives
 Cal Dooley, United States Congressman, also president and CEO of National Food Processors Association
 Dave Loebsack, Congressman, Iowa, 2nd District
 George Miller, United States Congressman, California, 7th District
 Jimmy Panetta, assistant district attorney in Monterey County, California
 Kim Schrier, Congresswoman, Washington, 8th District
 Jackie Speier, Congresswoman

State government

Mayors

Judges

Military
 Bradley Becker, former United States Army lieutenant general
 Howard B. Bromberg, lieutenant general, United States Army Deputy Chief of Staff
 William H. Forster, United States Army lieutenant general
 Bonnie Burnham Potter, first female physician in the Navy Medical Corps to be selected for flag rank
 John M. Wood, Major General in the United States Air Force; current commander of the Third Air Force

Other

Winemaking

Miscellaneous

See also
 List of University of California, Davis faculty

References

External links
 Famous UC Davis Alumni on the Davis Wiki

Davis alumni